The trio sonata is a genre, typically consisting of several movements, with two melody instruments and basso continuo. Originating in the early 17th century, the trio sonata was a favorite chamber ensemble combination in the Baroque era.

Basic structure
The trio sonata typically consisted of three parts, two violins and (basso) continuo. However, the two violins could be substituted with pairs of flutes, recorders, oboes, or violin and viola da gamba. The third part, the continuo, has two components. First, it includes the bass line, which commonly was played by a bass viol, violone, violoncello, or bassoon. Second, it includes a harmony-producing instrument, such as a small organ, a harpsichord, or a theorbo. The continuo could be performed by two or more performers; a cellist to play the bass line and a harpsichordist or organist to focus on the harmonies. Because there normally are two people playing the continuo part, there are usually four players in all. This accounts for the title of Henry Purcell's second collection, Ten Sonatas in Four Parts (1697); his first publication Sonnata's of III Parts (1683) likewise included separate parts for cello and keyboard. From about the middle of the 17th century two distinct types of sonatas appeared: sonata da camera (chamber sonata) and sonata da chiesa (church sonata).

Composers, compositions and variant formats
The genre originated as instrumental adaptation of the three-part texture common in Italian vocal music in the late 16th century. The earliest published trio sonatas appeared in Venice (Salamone Rossi Il primo libro delle sinfonie e gagliarde, 1607) and in Milan (Giovanni Paolo Cima, Sonata a tre for violin, cornett and continuo in the collection Concerti ecclesiastici, 1610).

Arcangelo Corelli
Italian composer Arcangelo Corelli was one of the most influential composers of the trio sonata. The published trio sonatas by Corelli are:

Twelve Trio-Sonatas, Op. 1 (dedicated to Queen Christina of Sweden) published in Rome in 1681
Twelve Chamber Sonatas, Op. 2 (dedicated to Cardinal Panfili), published in Rome in 1685
Twelve Trio-Sonatas, Op. 3 (dedicated to Francesco II d'Este, Duke of Modena), published in Rome in 1689
Twelve Trio-Sonatas, Op. 4 (dedicated to Cardinal Ottoboni), published in Rome in 1694.

An additional collection of Trio Sonatas, for two violins, cello, and organ, was published as "Op. post." in Amsterdam, in 1714. Corelli's trios would serve as models for other composers well into the 18th century.

Johann Sebastian Bach
German composer Johann Sebastian Bach is another notable composer of the trio sonata, but he was known for shying away from the traditional structure of the sonata. He typically played the three parts with fewer than three instruments. One part could be played by a violin and the other two parts could be played by a keyboard, or all three parts could be played on the organ.

Trio sonatas by Bach include:

 Trio Sonatas for organ, BWV 525–530, combining all three parts on one instrument: typically the right hand, left hand and pedals will each take a different part thus creating the same texture as in a trio.
 A further innovation by Bach was the trio sonatas involving a concertante (obbligato) right-hand harpsichord part in addition to the bass line, plus one melodic instrument, thus for two players. Examples are the Six Sonatas for Violin and Harpsichord, BWV 1014–1019, three sonatas for viola da gamba and harpsichord, BWV 1027–1029, and two sonatas for flute and harpsichord, BWV 1030 and 1032; BWV 1020, BWV 1031 and BWV 1033 are doubtful.
 Trio Sonatas BWV 1036–1040: BWV 1039 is a variant version of BWV 1027. The attribution of BWV 1036-1038 to Bach is doubtful, but all are typical of baroque chamber music.
 The mid-18th-century manuscript D-B Mus. ms. Bach St 345 contains a Concerto (or: Trio Sonata) in C major for violin, cello and continuo, arranged from (or: earlier version of) BWV 525/1, 1032/2 and 525/3 respectively. The 1998 edition of the Bach-Werke-Verzeichnis lists this version as BWV 525a, and considers the attribution of the arrangement to Bach doubtful. Based on the New Bach Edition, the Bach Digital website gives "BWV deest" instead of the BWV number 525a for this chamber music version.

Other composers
 Tomaso Albinoni, 12 sonatas da chiesa Op. 1, twelve balletti a tre Op. 3, six sonatas da camera as part of Op. 8, six unpublished trio sonatas Op. 11, and a further six trio sonatas without opus number in a manuscript in Vienna, Österreichische Nationalbibliothek, Musiksammlung.
 Carl Philipp Emanuel Bach wrote at least 44 trio sonatas, including one for flute, viola, and piano, said to have been given its world premiere by the Society for Forgotten Music at the New York Public Library on 30 January 1949. His best-known work in the genre is the programmatic Trio ("Sanguineus und Melancholicus"), in C minor, composed in 1749 and published in Nuremberg in 1751, which exists in two versions: one for obbligato keyboard and violin, the other for two violins and continuo.
 William Boyce, 12 Trio Sonatas for two violins and continuo (1747).
 Dieterich Buxtehude, Op. 1, six sonatas, and Op. 2, seven sonatas, scored for violin, viola da gamba and basso continuo. These were the only works by Buxtehude that were published during his lifetime. Though real trio texture does occur from time to time, these are really sonate a due for violin and viola da gamba, with the continuo often being a simplification of the gamba part. There are however four genuine trio sonatas by Buxtehude surviving in manuscript, two for two violins, viola da gamba and continuo in C and G major (BuxWV 266 and 271), one for two violins and continuo in F major (BuxWV 270, fragmentary), and one for viola da gamba, viola, and continuo in D major (BuxWV 267).
 François Couperin published a number of trio sonatas: Le Parnasse, ou L’apothéose de Corelli, grande sonade en trio, for two violins and continuo (Paris, 1724); Concert instrumental sous le titre d’Apothéose composé à la mémoire immortelle de l’incomparable Monsieur de Lully, for two violins (two flutes, or other unspecified instruments), and continuo (Paris, 1725); and the collection Les nations: sonades et suites de simphonies en trio, for two violins and continuo (Paris, 1726), consisting of La Françoise [La pucelle], L’Espagnole [La visionnaire], L’impériale, and La Piemontoise [L’astrée]. In addition, two trio sonatas have survived in manuscript: La Steinquerque and La superbe, both for two violins and continuo.
 Domenico Gallo, 12 trio sonatas for two violins and continuo, long erroneously attributed to Pergolesi, some movements of which were arranged for Stravinsky's ballet Pulcinella.
 Johann Gottlieb Goldberg, a student of J. S. Bach, composed at least six trio sonatas. Two trio sonatas for flute, violin, and continuo are listed in a Breitkopf catalogue, but have gone missing.
 George Frideric Handel, trio sonatas Opp. 2 and 5, all in sonata da chiesa form. The attribution to Handel of the six trios HWV 380-385 for two oboes and continuo is doubtful, and the authenticity of the three trios HWV 393-395 is uncertain.
 Jacques-Martin Hotteterre, Sonates en trio pour les flûtes traversières et a bec, violon, hautbois, Op. 3 (1712).
 Pietro Antonio Locatelli, six Trio Sonatas, Op. 5, for two violins or two traversos and continuo (1736).
 Johann Pachelbel, Musikalische Ergötzung ("Musical Delight"), containing six suites for two violins and basso continuo, each commencing with a sonata, followed by a succession of dances. The violin parts use scordatura tuning. The sonatas are of two types. Nos. 1 and 3 are marked Allegro, and are fughettas. The remaining four are Adagio movements and are similar to French overtures, in two sections.
 Henry Purcell, Sonnata's of III Parts, 1683, ten sonatas in four parts, 1697, but both sets are scored for two violins, bass viol, and organ or harpsichord. In terms of style, Purcell's trio sonatas are conservative, modeled on the older generation of Italians (Giovanni Legrenzi, Lelio Colista, and Giovanni Battista Vitali) rather than Corelli or Giovanni Battista Bassani.
 Gottfried Heinrich Stölzel, over 25 extant trio sonatas, including two for solo organ. Others for continuo (sometimes indicated as harpsichord) and diverse combinations of flute(s), violin(s), oboes or unspecified instruments.
 Georg Philipp Telemann, around 100 trio sonatas in TWV 42. The earliest sonatas exhibit the Corelli style most clearly, while later works anticipate the mid-century Empfindsamkeit and galant styles, or mix Italian, French, and Polish styles.
 
 Antonio Vivaldi, 12 trio sonatas da camera Op. 1, two trio sonatas mixed with solo sonatas in Op. 5, and thirteen unpublished trios. One further trio sonata, RV 80, in G major, for two flutes and continuo, is attributed to Vivaldi but is probably spurious.
 Jan Dismas Zelenka, ZWV 181, composed around 1721–1722.

References

Sources

Further reading
 Allsop, Peter. 1992. The Italian "Trio" Sonata: From Its Origins until Corelli. Oxford Monographs on Music. Oxford: Clarendon Press; New York: Oxford University Press. .
 Apel, Willi. 1990. Italian Violin Music of the Seventeenth Century, edited by Thomas Binkley. Bloomington: Indiana University Press. .
 Defant, Christine. 1985. Kammermusik und Stylus phantasticus: Studien zu Dietrich Buxtehudes Triosonaten. Europäische Hochschulschriften / European University Studies / Études Universitaires Européennes. Frankfurt: Peter Lang. .
 Dürr, Alfred (ed.). 1987. Eight Short Preludes and Fugues BWV 553–560: Formerly Ascribed to Johann Sebastian Bach. Kassel: Bärenreiter. BA 6497. ISMN 9790006480098. 
 Hogwood, Christopher. 1979. The Trio Sonata. BBC Music Guides. London: British Broadcasting Corporation. .
 Kamien, Roger. 2008. Music an Appreciation, sixth brief edition. Boston: McGraw-Hill.  (annotated instructor's edition);  (student edition)
 Mangsen, Sandra. 2001. "Trio Sonata". The New Grove Dictionary of Music and Musicians, second edition, edited by Stanley Sadie and John Tyrrell. London: Macmillan Publishers.
 Schenk, Erich. 2005. Die Triosonate. Das Musikwerk, eine Beispielsammlung zur Musikgeschichte, Neuausgabe 20. Laaber: Laaber Verlag. .

 
Musical form